The 12"/50 caliber Bethlehem gun was a US naval gun designed in 1910 as the main armament for the Argentine Navy’s dreadnought battleships of the .

Design 
The gun was designed in 1910, and it was probably based on the US 12"/50 (30.5 cm) Mark 7 naval gun with a breech weight added.
The guns were manufactured at the Bethlehem Steel Corporation.
Twelve 305 mm guns were mounted in six twin (2-gun) turrets, two in front, two behind, and one on each side, on each of the ships in the class.

Measurements and Capabilities
The gun weighed 66 tons including the breech and was capable of an average rate of fire of 2–3 rounds a minute. It could throw an 870 lb. (394.6 kg) Mark 15 armor-piercing shell 24,000 yards (21,950 meters) at an elevation of 14.7°, while the "barrel life" of the guns was 200 shots.

The previous 12" gun, manufactured for the U.S. Navy, was the Mark 7 version, a very similar gun which had been designed and installed in the 1912 era s.

Service 

This gun was installed in the Argentine Navy Rivadavia-class battleships Rivadavia and Moreno. Six more guns were later contracted by Chile for coastal defence, but they were requisitioned by the US government due to the WWI. Half was converted for railway sliding carriages and half was saved as spares. In 1940 all six gun tubes were bought by Brazil from US military surplus but never used.

See also
BL 12 inch Mk XI – XII naval gun British equivalent
Obukhovskii 12"/52 Pattern 1907 gun Russian equivalent
30.5 cm SK L/50 gun German equivalent
 List of naval guns

References

Citations

Sources

External links
 History and specifications, at Naval Weapons of the World website (NavWeaps.com) (retrieved 2010-02-22)
 "Haze Gray & Underway" - World Battleship Lists - Argentina (retrieved 2010-02-22)
  "Historia y Arqueología Marítima" (HistArMar) - Battleships ARA Moreno & Rivadavia - History & Pictures (retrieved 2010-02-22)

Naval guns of Argentina
Naval guns of the United States
World War II naval weapons
305 mm artillery